Manjrekar James (born 5 August 1993) is a professional soccer player who plays as a centre-back for Forge FC in the Canadian Premier League. Born in Dominica, he represents the Canada national team at international level.

Early life
James was born in Roseau, Dominica. His father was born in Pichelin, and his mother was born in Grand Bay. James and his parents moved to North York, Ontario, Canada, when he was nine years old. At age 10, James signed for North York Hearts-Azzuri youth soccer club. At age 16, James signed for Sigma FC of the Ontario Soccer League.  At age 18, James went on trial with RCD Mallorca of La Liga. Although he had a successful trial at the club, James was not signed because of strict visa laws for foreign players in Spain. Following his trial at Mallorca, James went on a 10-day trial with SC Paderborn 07 of the 2. Bundesliga. During the trial, James went directly into training with the first team but was ultimately not signed.

Club career

Pécsi
In mid April 2013, James went on trial with Pécsi MFC of the Nemzeti Bajnokság I. After several months of training with the reserve squad, James was offered a contract. James made his professional debut March 18, 2014 in a Ligakupa, the Hungarian league cup, match against Videoton FC. James made his league debut for Pécsi on 18 October 2014, coming on as a late substitute for Roland Frőhlich and playing two minutes in a 2–0 defeat to Ferencvárosi. At the end of the season, Pécs were relegated to the Hungarian fourth division due an unstable financial situation. James and many other first team players were subsequently released.

Diósgyőri
After leaving Pécs, James signed with fellow Hungarian club Diósgyőri VTK on August 25, 2015.

Vasas
James moved to fellow Hungarian side Vasas on June 8, 2016. Prior to the 2017–18 Vasas season, James was criticized by the club for playing internationally with Canada during the 2017 Gold Cup, while Vasas played in the first round of the Europa League qualifiers. He started regularly for Vasas in 2017–18.

Midtjylland
James joined Danish Superliga side Midtjylland on June 12, 2018, signing a four-year deal. He was immediately loaned to Danish 1st Division Fredericia for the 2018–19 season. James made his debut for Fredericia on July 29 against Næstved, and scored his first goal for the club on August 5 against Roskilde. In January 2019, Midtjylland recalled him from Fredericia. He made his competitive debut for Midtjylland on March 13, starting in a 2018–19 Danish Cup match against Kolding IF. He made his league debut five days later on March 17 against SönderjyskE. Having featured in nine first team games in his first two years with the club, in March 2020 James signed a contract extension with Midtjylland until December 2023.

Loan to Lamia 
On 25 January 2021, James joined PAS Lamia 1964 on loan for the rest of the season.

Vejle
On 1 July 2021, it was announced that James had signed with Vejle Boldklub. On 22 February 2022, he was loaned out to Ukrainian club FC Chornomorets Odesa for the rest of 2022.

Forge FC
On March 10, 2023, James signed with Forge FC of the Canadian Premier League. This move reunited James with manager Bobby Smyrniotis who had previously coached him as a youth at Sigma FC.

International career

Youth 
James was called into camp with the Canada U18 squad in December 2011.  In 2012 and 2013, he was again called into several camps with the U20 team in preparation for the 2013 CONCACAF U-20 Championship in Mexico. In the tournament, James made one appearance, a 4–2 defeat to the United States in which he received a red card ejection.

Senior 
James was called up to the senior team for the first time in May 2014 for friendlies against Bulgaria and Moldova in Austria on May 23 and 27, respectively. James received his second call up to the national team for a January 2015 camp and friendlies against Iceland. He made his debut for Canada as a starter in the first of the two friendlies on January 16, 2015. James became cap-tied to Canada on June 11, 2015 against his native Dominica. Prior to the match, James received harassment from Dominica fans. James scored his first goal for Canada against Honduras in San Pedro Sula on September 2, 2016.

Career statistics

Club

International

Scores and results list Canada's goal tally first, score column indicates score after each James goal.

References

External links

 

1993 births
Living people
Association football defenders
Canadian soccer players
Soccer players from Toronto
Sportspeople from North York
People from Roseau
Dominica emigrants to Canada
Naturalized citizens of Canada
Canadian expatriate soccer players
Pécsi MFC players
Diósgyőri VTK players
Vasas SC players
FC Midtjylland players
FC Fredericia players
PAS Lamia 1964 players
Vejle Boldklub players
FC Chornomorets Odesa players
Nemzeti Bajnokság I players
Danish 1st Division players
Danish Superliga players
Ukrainian Premier League players
Canada men's youth international soccer players
Canada men's under-23 international soccer players
Canada men's international soccer players
Footballers at the 2015 Pan American Games
2017 CONCACAF Gold Cup players
Pan American Games competitors for Canada
Expatriate footballers in Hungary
Expatriate men's footballers in Denmark
Expatriate footballers in Greece
Expatriate footballers in Ukraine
Canadian expatriate sportspeople in Hungary
Canadian expatriate sportspeople in Denmark
Canadian expatriate sportspeople in Greece
Canadian expatriate sportspeople in Ukraine
Sigma FC players